Harpswell is a village and civil parish in the West Lindsey district of Lincolnshire, England.

According to the 2001 Census Harpswell had a population of 65. In 2011 the Office for National Statistics issued combined results for Hemswell and Harpswell, totalling 391 in 179 households.

Nearby RAF Hemswell was called Harpswell airfield when it first opened in 1916.

The parish church of St Chad's has a Saxon tower and was restored around 1890. It is a Grade I listed building.

References

External links

Villages in Lincolnshire
Civil parishes in Lincolnshire
West Lindsey District